Valentin Valentin is a 2015 French crime mystery film directed by Pascal Thomas and starring Marilou Berry, Vincent Rottiers and Marie Gillain.

Plot
The beautiful and shy Valentin, with whom all the women fall in love, has much to do between his insatiable mistress, Claudia; her jealous husband, Freddy; his selfish and immature mother; alcoholic neighbor, Jane; the concierge Antonia; the three neighboring youths on the 5th Floor, Noor, Florence and especially Elodie; and a mysterious young Chinese Tiger Lily, held in slavery in the house opposite.

There is a housewarming, with all the neighbors and friends of the neighborhood, triggering unexpected violence. Soon after, Valentin is found murdered in the nearby park under the bridge where he had to wait for Tiger Lily. Who committed the crime?

Cast

 Marilou Berry as Elodie
 Vincent Rottiers as Valentin Fontaine
 Marie Gillain as Claudia Livorno
 Arielle Dombasle as Valentin's mother
 Geraldine Chaplin as Jane
 Alexandra Stewart as Sylvia
 François Morel as Roger
 Isabelle Candelier as Rose
 Louis-Do de Lencquesaing as Freddy Livorno
 Christian Morin as Marius
 Agathe Bonitzer as Florence
 Christian Vadim as Sergio
 Christine Citti as Antonia
 Félix Moati as Romain
 Victoria Lafaurie as Noor
 Paul Minthe as Aymé
 Karolina Conchet as Lys Tigré
 Xin Wang as Madame Hou
 Pascal Bonitzer as The Inspector

References

External links
 

2015 films
2015 crime films
2010s French-language films
Films directed by Pascal Thomas
French crime films
Films based on British novels
2010s French films